Epapterus is a genus of driftwood catfishes that occur in South America.  There are currently two described species in this genus.

Species 
 Epapterus blohmi Vari, S. L. Jewett, Taphorn & C. R. Gilbert, 1984
 Epapterus dispilurus Cope, 1878

References

Auchenipteridae
Fish of South America
Fish of the Amazon basin
Fish of Venezuela
Fish of Paraguay
Fish of Argentina
Fish of Brazil
Catfish genera
Taxa named by Edward Drinker Cope